Víctor Estrella Burgos was the defending champion, but chose to play in the Shenzhen Open instead.

Seeds

Draw

Finals

Top half

Bottom half

References
 Main Draw
 Qualifying Draw

Seguros Bolivar Open- Singles
2015 Singles